Salvation!  (also known as Salvation!: Have You Said Your Prayers Today?) is a 1987 American black comedy film directed by Beth B, and starring Viggo Mortensen, Exene Cervenka, and Stephen McHattie. The film is a parody of televangelism, and was released right after the real-life Jim Bakker and Jimmy Swaggart scandals.

The film was released on VHS, but not as yet on DVD.

Plot
McHattie plays Reverend Randall, a Staten Island-based televangelist who has been bilking his flock and secretly watches pornography while he is rehearsing his sermons in his stately home.  Cervenka plays Rhonda Stample, a born again Christian who watches his programs and regularly sends him money, to the irritation of Rhonda's non-believer husband, Jerome (Viggo Mortensen).
Shortly after Jerome loses his factory job, his sister in-law Lenore (Dominique Davalos) comes to Rev. Randall's home in a rainstorm, claiming car trouble. He reluctantly lets her in, and the two take turns seducing and then retreating from each other, until they finally engage in violent lovemaking. Jerome shows up later that evening, along with two boorish neighbors, and beat him for what they believe is an unwanted encounter with Lenore. All of them contemplate the possibilities of blackmail against him with a sex scandal, but Randall manages to escape his home. That morning, he is picked up hitchhiking by Rhonda, who pitches him on the notion of bringing her into his ministry. In order to avert the intentions of her husband and sister, he agrees to her idea.
Later, Rhonda's addition to Randall's program has become a huge success, with Jerome, Lenore, and the neighbors all enjoying a higher standard of living. But Rhonda gets drunk with power, and makes increasing demands on Randall, first to boot all the other parties from their ministry, and then for a bigger share of their proceeds. Randall resists the latter option, but ultimately gives in. The film finishes with Rhonda performing a heavy-metal inspired song of faith, "Destroy All Evil", with imagery associated with tropes of the musical style.

Soundtrack
The soundtrack album was released on Factory Benelux/Les Disques du Crépuscule (catalogue TWI-774) and Factory Australasia (catalogue FACT-182) in February 1988.

Track listing

Side A:
New Order: "Salvation Theme" - 2:14
Jumpin' Jesus (Arthur Baker and Stuart Kimball, vocals by Stephen McHattie): "You Can't Blackmail Jesus" - 4:26
Cabaret Voltaire: "Twanky Party" - 4:17
New Order: "Touched by the Hand of God" - 5:02
Dominique* (Dominique Davalos): "Play The Beat" - 3:24
The Hood: "Nightmare" - 1:54

Side B:
New Order: "Let's Go" - 3:44
The Hood: "Salvation! Have You Said Your Prayers Today" - 4:10
Arthur Baker: "Come On" - 2:45
New Order: "Sputnik" - 2:31
Cabaret Voltaire: "Jesus Saves" - 4:02
New Order: "Skullcrusher" - 2:52
Dominique*: "Destroy All Evil" - 3:33

Charts

References

External links
 
 
 

1987 films
1980s black comedy films
1987 independent films
1980s parody films
1980s satirical films
American black comedy films
American independent films
American parody films
American satirical films
Factory Records compilation albums
Films about evangelicalism
Films about television
Films shot in New York City
Parodies of televangelism
Religious comedy films
1987 comedy films
1980s English-language films
1980s American films